Concert Classics may refer to:

Concert Classics (Roxy Music album)
Concert Classics (Strawbs album)
Concert Classics, Vol. 4, by UK
Concert Classics, by the Ozark Mountain Daredevils